DBN is a German artist and record producer trio from Hamburg. Its members are Djani Dzihan, Tobias Hahn, Patrick Kroepels.

Biography
DBN's remix of John Dahlbäck's Everywhere and the single The Nighttrain were released in 2007. After various productions and remixes for Sebastian Ingrosso, EDX, Eddie Thoneick, Roger Sanchez, Bob Sinclar, Erick Morillo, Dirty South, Steve Angello, Laidback Luke, Wippenberg, Jean Elan and 2raumwohnung, DBN released their single Asteroidz. This was followed by Jack Is Back, which reached number 1 in the German dance charts). My Belief, which they made with Syke'n'Sugarstarr and Cosmo Klein, also topped the German dance charts, as did Chicago. For these, DBN was recognised  as the "Top Single Act National 2010".

In the recent past, DBN have worked on remixes for Tim Berg, Norman Doray and Sebastien Drums, Nalin & Kane, Medina, Danny Freakazoid and German pop acts Ich+Ich, made the singles Bomjacker, Buckshee, and made Sushi EP with Patric la Funk.

Discography

Singles

Remixes (selection)
 ICH UND ICH: Universum (DBN Remix)
 EDX: Rubin (DBN Remix)
 Patric La Funk: Yeah (DBN Remix)
 Haji & Emanuel featuring Roachford: In The Moment (DBN Remix)
 Francesco Diaz & Young Rebels: Alaska (DBN Remix)
 Steve Angello & Laidback Luke ft. Robin S.: Show Me Love (DBN Remix)
 Norman Doray & Tristan Garner: Last Forever (DBN Remix)
 DJ DLG & Erick Morillo: Where Are You Now (D.O.N.S. & DBN Remix)
 Dirty South feat. Rudy: Let It Go (D.O.N.S. & DBN Remix)
 Milk & Sugar: No No No (D.O.N.S. & DBN Remix)
 Roger Sanchez: Release Yo' Self (D.O.N.S. & DBN Remix)
 Bob Sinclar pres. Fireball: What I Want (D.O.N.S. & DBN Dub)
 Eddie Thoneick: Freak 'N You (D.O.N.S. & DBN Remix)
 Those Usual Suspects: Greece 2000 (D.O.N.S. & DBN Remix)
 John Dahlbäck: Blink (D.O.N.S. & DBN Chainsaw Remix)
 John Dahlbäck: Everywhere (D.O.N.S. meets DBN In The Box)
 Nalin & Kane: Beachball 2010 (DBN Remix)
 2Raumwohnung: Rette Mich Später (DBN Remix)

Commissional Works
 Niki Belucci: Get Up (D.O.N.S. & DBN Mix)
 Greg Cerrone: Invincible (D.O.N.S. Remix)

Radio and Podcast
 Delicious Housetunes (resident)
 Bash FM (resident)
 Radio FG Underground
 DBN-Podcast at iTunes (monthly)
 DBN loves... (weekly radio show)

Awards
 Top Single Act National 2010 (German Dance Charts)
 Various top-5-rankings in the German Dance- and Club-Charts

References

External links
 official website
 

House music
German musical groups